The women's team pursuit race of the 2012 World Single Distance Speed Skating Championships was held on March 25.

Results

References

2012 World Single Distance Speed Skating Championships
World